Jorge Mathias (13 May 1924 – 28 February 1996) was a Portuguese equestrian. He competed in two events at the 1960 Summer Olympics.

References

External links
 

1924 births
1996 deaths
Portuguese male equestrians
Olympic equestrians of Portugal
Equestrians at the 1960 Summer Olympics
People from Évora
Sportspeople from Évora District